The Tectosages or Tectosagii (Gaulish: *Textosagioi, 'Dwelling-Seekers', or 'Possessions-Seekers') were one of the three ancient Gallic tribes of Galatia in central Asia Minor, together with the Tolistobogii and Trocmii.

Name 
The ethnonym Tectosagii is a latinized form of Gaulish *Textosagioi (sing. Textosagios), where the voiceless velar fricative ⟨x⟩, unknown in Latin, was replaced with the sound ⟨k⟩. It can be translated as 'those who seek a dwelling', or 'those who seek possessions', from the Celtic stem *texto- ('goods, property, possessions'; cf. Old Irish techt 'possession') attached to sagi- ('who is seeking'). The name can be compared with the Old Irish legal term techtaigidir, meaning 'to seek to establish (or reestablish) legal claim to land'.

History 
According to Strabo, the Tectosages came originally from the region around Tolosa in Gaul, where they had been part of the tribal confederation of the Volcae. During the Gallic invasion of the Balkans, c. 280 BC, a branch of the Volcae Tectosages, returning from Delphi, split from the main group and joined two other tribes, the Tolistobogii and the Trocmi. Around 278 BC, they were hired as mercenaries by Nicomedes I of Bithynia and crossed the Bosporus. After leaving Bithynia, they raided in Asia Minor and finally settled in eastern Phrygia, where they established a new Celtic confederate identity as the Galatians.
The Tectosages occupied the centre of the Galatian territory, round their capital Ancyra, with the Tolistobogii in the west and the Trocmii to the east.

References

Bibliography

Further reading

External links
 

Historical Celtic peoples
Gauls
Ancient Galatia
History of Ankara Province